Question in Details is a 2010 Hungarian romantic drama film directed by Zsombor Dyga, starring Ferenc Elek, Kátya Tompos and Roland Rába. It tells the story of a man and a woman who has been on a less than successful dinner date and continue to talk throughout the night. The film was released in Hungary on 11 February 2010.

Cast
 Ferenc Elek as Zoli
 Kátya Tompos as Eszti
 Roland Rába as Gábor
 Tamara Zsigmond as Böbe
 Szilárd Wass as Dex
 Marcell Váczy as Balázs
 Maxim Váczy as Bence
 Zoltán Belényi as Alex
 Sarolta Bodó as Vera

Reception
Origo'''s Bori Bujdosó compared the film to Richard Linklater's Tape'', which has a similar chamber play setting, and wrote that although this is nothing new in cinema, it has rarely been done before in a Hungarian film. She wrote that the film contains "Hollywood clichés" but complemented the pace and dialogues.

Lynden Barber of Australia's Special Broadcasting Service wrote:
For its first two thirds Dyga successfully keeps his drama aloft, aided by two exemplary performances and a directorial approach that privileges cinema rather than the filmed play the material might suggest. Sadly, though, when Eszti’s celebrity chef brother Gabor (Roland Rába) returns home, the story tosses away its credibility by relying on an outlandish coincidence that is meant to carry the force of revelation. ... Gábor Marosi's cinematography is burnished and moody, though this too-dark transfer annoyingly loses the image entirely in a few spots.

References

External links 

2010 films
2010 romantic drama films
Hungarian romantic drama films
2010s Hungarian-language films